William Bateman-Hanbury, 1st Baron Bateman of Shobdon (24 June 1780 – 22 July 1845) was a Member of Parliament and later a Baron in the Peerage of the United Kingdom.

At birth his name was William Hanbury, although he was a distant descendant of Sir James Bateman who had been Lord Mayor of London and was his 2nd great-grandfather. Hanbury studied at Eton College and then Christ Church, Oxford graduating from the later in 1798. In 1802 he inherited Shobdon Court, near Leominster, Herefordshire from John Bateman, 2nd Viscount Bateman.

He served as a Whig MP from Northampton from 1810–1818.  From 1819–1820 he was High Sheriff of Herefordshire. In 1835 Hanbury made an unsuccessful run for Parliament as a liberal.

In January 1837 Hanbury became the first Baron Bateman of Shobdon.  In February he had his name legally changed to William Bateman-Hanbury. In 1822 he had married Elizabeth Chichester, the granddaughter of Arthur Chichester, 1st Marquess of Donegall. They had four sons and four daughters. He was succeeded by his eldest son William Bateman-Hanbury, 2nd Baron Bateman.

Arms

References

External links 
 

1780 births
1845 deaths
Whig (British political party) MPs for English constituencies
Members of the Parliament of the United Kingdom for English constituencies
UK MPs 1807–1812
UK MPs 1812–1818
UK MPs who were granted peerages
1
High Sheriffs of Herefordshire
People educated at Eton College
Alumni of Christ Church, Oxford
Peers of the United Kingdom created by William IV